The Four was a television music competition franchise created by British-Israeli production and distribution company, Armoza Formats. It first broadcast in the United States on Fox in January 2018.

Format
The Four is a singing competition that differs among similar talent competitions, in that there are no stage auditions. The artists, also known as the challengers, are held in the holding room before singing in front of a live studio audience and the judges. The panel of people in the music industry ultimately decides the best challengers that compete against "The Four". The members consist of vocalists of varying genres, and they must win challenges against new artists to keep their seat and remain as a member of "The Four". At the end of the contest, the last singer standing among "The Four" wins the competition.

Rounds
There are two distinct rounds in The Four. In the performances round, new challengers must earn their seat by performing in front of a live studio audience, the panel of judges and "The Four". After the performance, the judges then vote and make a "Yes" or "No" decision, signifying the challenger's fate in the competition. If a challenger receives a unanimous "Yes" votes from the panel, they advance to the next round of the competition. A red ring given to the challenger signifies a "No", ending his or her time in the competition. Artists who advance to the challenge round can compete against a member of "The Four" for their seat. In a sing-off style battle, the challenger and "The Four" member sing against each other for their seat. After the challenge, the studio audience then votes to decide which of the two should remain in the competition. The winner locks his or her seat for the rest of the night and cannot be challenged again until the next episode.

The Four around the world
  Franchise that is currently airing
  Franchise that is not currently airing, but is slated to return in the future
  Franchise that has ended
  Franchise that is in development
  Franchise whose status is unknown

See also
 List of reality television show franchises
 List of television show franchises

References

Television franchises
2018 American television series debuts